William Guise (Guilelmus Guisius) (c.1653–1683), was an English orientalist.

Life
He was the son of John Guise from a family originating at Elmore Court near Gloucester.

He went to Oriel College, Oxford, in 1669 at age 16. He graduated BA in 1674 and was then made a fellow of All Souls College, Oxford, from 1674 to 1680, being granted an MA in 1677. He spent the last years of his life in St Mary's College, Oxford.

He died of smallpox on 3 September 1683. His tomb in the college chancel of St Michael's Church in Oxford was sculpted by William Bird.

Family

His wife Frances Guise outlived him. They had a son John Guise and daughter Frances Guise.

Works
He is known for his scholarly work on Zeraim, an order of the Mishnah, for which he produced a Latin translation and commentary. He made use of a wide range of Islamic literature, and particularly relied on the Arabic dictionaries of Fairuzabadi and Jauhari. It was published as Misnae Pars (1690), edited by Edward Bernard.

References

1653 births
1683 deaths
Alumni of Oriel College, Oxford
Christian Hebraists
English orientalists
Fellows of All Souls College, Oxford
Linguists from England
Place of birth missing
Place of death missing